JIW may refer to:
 Jane's Infantry Weapons, a publication of Jane's Information Group
 J. I. Wedgwood (1883–1951), the first Presiding Bishop of the Liberal Catholic Church
 Jiwani Airport, in Balochistan, Pakistan
 JIW, a case study of lexical-gustatory synesthesia